Edward Bass (1726–1803) was an American bishop.

Edward Bass may also refer to:

Edward P. Bass (born 1945), American environmentalist and financier
Edward Bass, character in Key Largo (film)
Edward Bass (producer) of Come Early Morning